The 1972 Currie Cup was the 34th edition of the Currie Cup, the premier annual domestic rugby union competition in South Africa.

Fixtures and Results

Final

See also

 Currie Cup

References

1972
1972 in South African rugby union
1972 rugby union tournaments for clubs